John Rundell (8 February 1895 – 25 August 1973) was a Scottish footballer who played as a goalkeeper, primarily for Motherwell where he spent close to 10 years (during several of which the team finished in the top five positions in the Scottish Football League table), eventually being replaced by Allan McClory.

He then moved to Arthurlie, where he played for a season alongside younger brother George, a wing half. He moved to North Wales in later life.

Jock is credited with scoring a league goal for Arthurlie during the 1925–26 Scottish Division Two campaign, but the nature of this is unconfirmed, possibly being a 'souvenir' penalty in an unimportant fixture when it was known his career was nearing its end, or perhaps an error with a goal scored by George but credited to the better-known Rundell sibling.

References

1895 births
1973 deaths
Sportspeople from Larkhall
Scottish footballers
Footballers from South Lanarkshire
Association football goalkeepers
Larkhall Thistle F.C. players
Scottish Junior Football Association players
Motherwell F.C. players
Arthurlie F.C. players
Royal Albert F.C. players
Scottish Football League players